John Craggs may refer to:

 Jack Craggs (1880–?), English footballer for Sunderland, Nottingham Forest and Reading
 John Craggs (songwriter) (1849–?), poet from North Sunderland 
 John Craggs (footballer) (born 1948), retired footballer for Newcastle, Middlesbrough and Darlington